Togher is a common placename in Ireland, deriving from the Irish word "tochar", meaning a causeway. It may refer to:
 Togher, Cork, a suburb of Cork City, Ireland
 Togher, County Louth, a large parish in County Louth, Ireland
 Joe Togher (18981974), Irish Republican

See also 
 

Surnames of Irish origin